St. Jacob is James, son of Zebedee, or Saint James the Great. James is used as a translation of the Hebrew name Jacob (Ya'akov).

St. Jacob, St. Jacobs or St. Jakob may also refer to:

People
Saint James (disambiguation)
 Saint Jacob of Alaska, missionary of the Orthodox Church
 Saint Jacob of Nisibis (died c. 338 or 350), also known as Saint James of Nisibis, or Saint Jacob of Mygdonia

Places
St. Jacob, Illinois, U.S.
St. Jacob Township, Madison County, Illinois, U.S.
St. Jacobs, Ontario, Canada
Sankt Jakob in Haus, Austria
Sankt Jakob im Rosental, Austria 
Sankt Jakob im Walde, Austria
St. Jakob Arena in Basel, Switzerland, noted for ice hockey
St. Jakob Stadium in Basel (1954–1998)
St. Jakob-Park in Basel, Switzerland

Churches
Šibenik Cathedral, Croatia, often known as St. Jacob's
St. James's Cathedral, Riga, Latvia, often known as St. Jacob's
St. James's Parish Church (Ljubljana), Slovenia, often known as St. Jacob's

Ships
ST Jacobs, an Indonesian steam tug in service 1949-59

See also
Jacob (disambiguation)
Jakob (disambiguation)
Saint Jakov